James Joseph Quinlan (September 13, 1833 – August 29, 1906) was a Union Army officer during the American Civil War and a recipient of America's highest military decoration—the Medal of Honor—for his actions at the Battle of Savage's Station.

Quinlan was appointed as major of the 88th New York Infantry in December 1861. He became the regiment's lieutenant colonel in October 1862, and was discharged in February 1863.  

After the war, he became a companion of the New York Commandery of the Military Order of the Loyal Legion of the United States.

Quinlan was buried at Calvary Cemetery, Woodside, Queens County, New York.

Medal of Honor citation

Rank and Organization:
Rank and organization: Major, 88th New York Infantry. Place and date: At Savage Station, Va., June 29, 1862. Entered service at: New York, N.Y. Born: September 13, 1833, Ireland. Date of issue: February 18, 1891.

Citation:
Led his regiment on the enemy's battery, silenced the guns, held the position against overwhelming numbers, and covered the retreat of the 2d Army Corps.

See also

List of American Civil War Medal of Honor recipients: Q–S

References

1833 births
1906 deaths
19th-century Irish people
Irish soldiers in the United States Army
United States Army Medal of Honor recipients
Irish-born Medal of Honor recipients
Union Army officers
Irish emigrants to the United States (before 1923)
American Civil War recipients of the Medal of Honor
People from Clonmel
Military personnel from County Tipperary